Chetone phyleis is a moth of the family Erebidae. It was described by Herbert Druce in 1885. It is found in Ecuador and Peru.

References

Chetone
Moths described in 1885